William Langhorne may refer to:

Sir William Langhorne, 1st Baronet (c. 1631–1715), colonial administrator in British India under the East India Company
Will Langhorne, racing car driver
William Langhorne, clergyman, who with his brother John Langhorne translated Plutarch's Lives